The 1985 All-Ireland Senior Camogie Championship Final was the 51st All-Ireland Final and the deciding match of the 1985 All-Ireland Senior Camogie Championship, an inter-county camogie tournament for the top teams in Ireland.

Joan Gormley scored Dublin's goal after 14 minutes but they failed to capitalise, losing by five points in the end.

References

All-Ireland Senior Camogie Championship Finals
All-Ireland Senior Camogie Championship Final
All-Ireland Senior Camogie Championship Final
All-Ireland Senior Camogie Championship Final, 1985